Toulgoetodes tersella is a moth in the family Crambidae. It was described by Zeller in 1872. It is found in Colombia.

References

Moths described in 1872
Scopariinae